The women's 3 kilometres individual pursuit competition at the 2010 Asian Games was held on 13 and 14 November at the Guangzhou Velodrome.

Schedule
All times are China Standard Time (UTC+08:00)

Records

Results

Qualifying

Round 1

Heat 1

Heat 2

Heat 3

Heat 4

Summary

Finals

Bronze

Gold

References

External links 
Results

Track Women individual pursuit